Martin Dawson may refer to:
 Martin D. Dawson, British professor of photonics
 Martin Henry Dawson, Canadian-born researcher in the field of infectious diseases